La Leonesa is a town in Chaco Province, Argentina. It is the head town of the Bermejo Department.

La Leonesa forms an urban agglomeration with the town of Las Palmas called La Leonesa-Las Palmas.

External links

Populated places in Chaco Province